The , commonly called , originate in relatively recent settlement from mainland Japan. The greater part of Hokkaidō was settled from a mix of areas, especially the Tōhoku and Hokuriku regions, from the Meiji period onwards, so that various Japanese dialects became mixed together on Hokkaidō.

The relationship of Hokkaidō dialect to the rest of Japanese—and whether there even is a coherent Hokkaidō dialect—are the subject of debate. Shibata (2003) mentions three theories: 
Inland varieties are part of the Kantō dialect, while coastal varieties are part of the Tōhoku dialect
There is a single Hokkaidō dialect, which is a distinct branch of Eastern Japanese
There is a Hokkaidō dialect, but it descends from Niigata dialect (one of the Tōkai–Tōsan dialects), a transitional form with Western Japanese features.

Tōhoku influence is strongest in coastal areas, especially on the Oshima Peninsula in the south, where the local variety is commonly called . The urban dialect of Sapporo is quite close to Standard Japanese. Western features may have been brought by merchants from Kansai and Hokuriku following the Kitamaebune ("northern-bound ships") trading route.

Also spoken on Hokkaidō is the Ainu language, which was in wide use there before Japanese settlement and still has a few elderly speakers.

Expressions
The -re imperative form for ichidan verbs and s-irregular verb instead of Standard form -ro
The volitional and presumptive suffix -be; from Tohoku dialect
The presumptive suffix -sho or -ssho; contraction of Standard polite presumptive form deshō
tōkibi for "corn" instead of Standard tōmorokoshi; also used in many Japanese dialects
shibareru for "to freeze, freezing cold" instead of Standard kogoeru; from Tohoku dialect
nageru for "to throw away" instead of Standard suteru; from Tohoku dialect; nageru means "to throw" in Standard
waya for "fruitless, no good" instead of Standard dame; from Western Japanese
shitakke for casual "good-bye" or "then" instead of Standard (sore) ja
namara for "very" instead of Standard totemo; since the 1970s from Niigata dialect

References

Japanese dialects
Culture in Hokkaido